Shortcut to Somewhere was the second single released from Genesis keyboard player Tony Banks's 1986 album Soundtracks. The A-side, which had been part of the  soundtrack for the film Quicksilver, featured Fish on vocals, his only commercial recording outside Marillion before his departure from the band in late 1988. Fish also wrote the lyrics for the title track, a fast, keyboard-based pop song similar to the Genesis material of this period, with a typical 1980s production. A section of the song was performed live by Genesis as part of a solo career medley on the 1988 Atlantic Records 40th Anniversary concert. It is the only Tony Banks solo song to have been played live by the band.

Cover
The cover features a photograph of Tony Banks and Fish each wearing a T-shirt of the other's band: Fish has an Abacab T-shirt, while Banks has a black Marillion T-shirt.

Video
The video for the single is a pastiche of the Raindrops Keep Fallin' on My Head sequence from the 1969 film Butch Cassidy and the Sundance Kid. Fish and Banks are on bicycles, dressed as Butch with bowler hats and waistcoats, playing with a young woman and entertaining her with their antics.

The clip is included on the DVD version of Fish's 2002 compilation album, Kettle of Fish, but not found on the CD.

Musicians
Fish: vocals

Track listings
Source: Genesis discography

7" Single
Shortcut to Somewhere (Banks/Dick) – 3:35
Smilin' Jack Casey (Banks)

12" Single
Side 1:
Shortcut to Somewhere (Banks/Dick)
Side 2:
Smilin' Jack Casey (Banks)
K2

References

External links
Music video on YouTube

1986 singles
1986 songs
Songs written by Fish (singer)
Songs written by Tony Banks (musician)
Virgin Records singles